Bitan Aharon (lit. Aharon's Pavilion) is a moshav in central Israel. Located in the Sharon plain between Hadera and Netanya, it falls under the jurisdiction of Hefer Valley Regional Council.

History
The moshav was founded in 1936. During its first years the members of the moshav hired workers to plant orange groves while its members lived in the cities. A decade later the village became more developed with new settlers joining. In 1947 it had a population of 100. The village was named after Aharon (Archibald Jacob, "Archie") Freiman, a leader of the World Zionist Organization in Canada and an advisor to Yehoshua Hankin. The two were instrumental in raising the funds to purchase Emek Hefer (the Hefer valley) in the 1920s and to make it available for Jewish settlement.

Bitan Aharon nature reserve

A 46-dunam nature reserve was declared in 1968, just east of the moshav. The reserve covers part of the second (middle) Kurkar ridge that runs on a north-south axis in this part of the Israeli coastal plain, and therefore includes a number of ancient rock-hewn tombs and burial caves. Flora includes Ziziphus spina-christi and Pancratium parviflorum.

Notable residents

Hen Lippin (born 1965), basketball player

References

Jewish villages in Mandatory Palestine
Moshavim
Agricultural Union
Populated places established in 1936
Nature reserves in Israel
1936 establishments in Mandatory Palestine
Populated places in Central District (Israel)